The Saurashtra script is an abugida script that is used by Saurashtrians of Tamil Nadu to write the Saurashtra language. The script is of Brahmic origin, although its exact derivation is not known which was later reformed and standardized by T.M.Ram Rai. Its usage has declined, and the Tamil and Latin scripts are now used more commonly.

Description and background

The Saurashtra Language of Tamil Nadu is written in its own script. In contrast, the inhabitants of Saurashtra utilize the Gujarati script. Because this is a minority language not taught in schools, people learn to write in Saurashtra Script through Voluntary Organisations like Sourashtra Vidya Peetam, Madurai. Saurashtra refers to both the language and its speakers; Saurashtra is also an area in Gujarat, India which was the home of the Saurashtra community prior to their southward migration. Vrajlal Sapovadia describes the Saurashtra language as a hybrid of Gujarati, Marathi & Tamil.

The language has had its own script for centuries, the earliest one available from 1880. Dr. H.N. Randle has written an article 'An Indo-Aryan Language of South India—Saurashtra Bhasha' in the Bulletin of School of Oriental and African Studies (BSOAS) 11 Part 1 p. 104-121 and Part II p. 310-327 (1943–46)Published by Cambridge University Press on behalf of School of Oriental and African Studies. This language is not taught in schools and hence had been confined to being merely a spoken language. But many great works like Bhagavath Gita and Tirukkural were translated into Sourashtram. It is now a literary language. Sahitya Akademi has recognized this language by conferring Bhasha Samman awards to Saurashtra Scholars.

Most Saurashtrians are bilingual in their mother tongue and Tamil and are more comfortable using their second language for all practical written communication though of late, some of them started writing in Sourashtram using Saurashtra script. There is an ongoing debate within the Saurashtra community regarding the use of the script for the Saurashtra language right from 1920 when a resolution was passed to adopt Devanagari Script for Saurashtra Language. Though some of the books were printed in Devanagari script, it failed to register the growth of the language.

But in practice because of lack of printing facilities, books are continued to be printed in Tamil Script with diacritic marks with superscript number for the consonants ka, ca, Ta, ta and pa and adding a colon to na, ma, ra, and la for aspirated forms, which are peculiar to the Saurashtra language. For writing Sourashtram using Devanagari Script, they require seven additional symbols to denote the short vowels 'e' and 'o' and four symbols for aspirated forms viz. nha, mha, rha and lha. They also require one more symbol to mark the sound of 'half yakara' which is peculiar to the Saurashtra language. The books printed in Devanagari Script were discarded because they did not represent the sounds properly.

The Commissioner for Linguistic Minorities, Allahabad by his letter No.123/5/1/62/1559 dated November 21, 1964 Communicated to Sourashtra Vidya Peetam, Madurai that the State Government were of the view that as only one book in Saurashtra Language had so far been submitted by Sourashtra Vidya Peetam for scrutiny, there was no point in examining the merits of only one book specially when the question regarding the usage of script - Hindi or Sourashtram, was still unsettled, and that the question of text books in Sourashtram might well lie over till a large number of books is available for scrutiny and for being prescribed as text books in Schools.

The Leaders in the Community could not realize the importance of teaching of mother tongue in schools and did not evince interest in production of textbooks in Sourashtram for class use. Now an awareness has arisen in the Community, and Sourashtra Vidya Peetam wants to teach the Saurashtra language through multimedia as suggested by Commissioner for Linguistic Minorities in his 42nd Report for the year (July 2003 to June 2004). Of late in internet, many Sourashtra Yahoo groups in their website use the Roman script for the Saurashtra language.

Now the Saurashtra font is available in computers and this enabled the supporters of Saurashtra Script to print books in its own script. An electronic journal, printed in the Saurashtra Script. One journal, Bhashabhimani, is published from Madurai, in Saurashtra Script. Another journal, 'Jaabaali', is also published by the same Editor of Bhashabhimani from Madurai. The 'Zeeg' Saurashtra script practice Magazine is also published from Madurai only. All the three journals support the Saurashtra script only. There is a journal in Devanagari called " Palkar Sourashtra Samachar".

By the effort of All India Sourashtra Madhya Saba, the representation of Saurashtra community of Tamil Nadu,  Devnagari script is declared as writing system to Saurashtra language with two addition symbols.

Saurashtra Script

The letter order of Saurashtra script is similar to other Brahmic Scripts. The letters are vowels, consonants, and the compound letters which are formed essentially by adding a vowel sound to a consonant.

Vowels

Consonants

Compound letters

Numerals

Unicode

Saurashtra script was added to the Unicode Standard in April, 2008 with the release of version 5.1.

The Unicode block for Saurashtra is U+A880–U+A8DF:

References

Brahmic scripts